The  or Tanjō-Taishaku Mountains are in Kita-ku, Kobe, Hyōgo, Japan. The length of the mountain range is about 17 km. Tanjō and Taishaku are two major mountains in this mountain range.

Mountains
Mount Tanjō
Mount Taishaku
Mount Chigogabaka
Mount Shibire
Mount Kisurashi

History
The Tanjō range is small but rich in history. The history has deep relation with the temple , on Mount Tanjō. The name Tanjō, and its older names, Nibu and Nyu, refer to a mine of amalgam at this mountain. The Tanjō Shrine on the top of Mount Tanjō is a place to worship the goddess of amalgam which was believed to inhabit the mountain. Even today, many religious objects may be seen in this mountain range.

However, the Buddhist temples were burned by Toyotomi Hideyoshi in 1580 during a war between Oda Nobunaga and Bessho Nagaharu.  Hideyoshi was in the service of Nobunaga, and the Myōyō temple was allied with Nagaharu. The temples were rebuilt by Hideyoshi soon afterward, but were heavily damaged in the Haibutsu kishaku movement of the Meiji period, when Buddhism was persecuted in favor of the native Shinto religion.

Gallery
 

Mountain ranges of Hyōgo Prefecture